The eighteenth election to Cardiganshire County Council took place in April 1949. It was preceded by the 1946 election  and followed by the 1952 election.

Candidates
35 candidates were returned unopposed resulting in fifteen contests which was eight less than in 1946 but consistent with most of the inter-war period. 

Eight aldermen retired, of whom four sought election.

Outcome

There was very little change as the new council was composed entirely of Independents, apart from the sole Labour councillor who was re-elected unopposed at Aberystwyth. Four other Labour candidats were defeated.

Results

Aberaeron

Aberbanc

Aberporth

Aberystwyth Division 1

Aberystwyth Division 2

Aberystwyth Division 3

Aberystwyth Division 4

Aberystwyth Division 5

Aberystwyth Division 6

Aeron
}

Borth

Bow Street

Cardigan North

Cardigan South

Cilcennin

Cwmrheidol

Devil's Bridge

Felinfach

Goginan

Lampeter Borough

Llanarth

Llanbadarn Fawr

Llanddewi Brefi

Llandygwydd

Llandysul North

Llandysul South

Llansysiliogogo

Llanfair Clydogau

Llanfarian

Llanfihangel y Creuddyn

Llangoedmor

Llangeitho

Llangrannog

Llanilar

Llanrhystyd

Llanllwchaiarn

Llansantffraed

Llanwnen

Llanwenog

Lledrod

Nantcwnlle

New Quay

Penbryn

Strata Florida

Taliesin

Talybont

Trefeurig

Tregaron

Troedyraur

Ysbyty Ystwyth

Election of Aldermen

In addition to the 50 councillors the council consisted of 16 county aldermen. Aldermen were elected by the council, and served a six-year term. Following the 1949 election, there were eight aldermanic vacancies which were filled at the annual meeting. 
The following retiring aldermen were re-elected:
J.D. Evans, New Cross
D.L. Herbert, Llangeitho
Meredydd Ll.G. Williams, Llanwenog
In addition, the following four new aldermen were elected:
Emlyn Abraham-Williams, Aberystwyth
D. Alban Davies, Llanrhystud
Simon Davies, Felinfach
D. Lloyd Thomas, Tresaith
Evan Davies, Llechryd

In addition to the three retiring aldermen who were re-elected, Simon Davies had previously served as an alderman from 1928 until 1946.

By-elections
Seven by-elections were held following the election of aldermen.

Aberystwyth Division 5 by-election

Felinfach by-election

Llanfihangel y Creuddyn by-election

Llangeitho by-election

Llangoedmor by-election

Llanrhystud by-election

Llanwenog by-election

Penbryn by-election

References

Ceredigion County Council elections
Cardiganshire
20th century in Ceredigion